Kanimozhi Karunanidhi (born 5 January 1968) is an Indian politician, poet and journalist. She is a Member of Parliament, representing Thoothukkudi constituency in the Lok Sabha (the lower house of India's Parliament). She was also a former MP, represented Tamil Nadu in the Rajya Sabha (the upper house of India's Parliament). Kanimozhi is the daughter of the former Chief Minister of Tamil Nadu M. Karunanidhi and his third wife Rajathi Ammal.

Kanimozhi belongs to the Indian political party Dravida Munnetra Kazhagam (DMK), where she functions as the deputy general secretary and women's wing secretary. Her half-brothers M. K. Alagiri and M. K. Stalin are the former Minister of Chemicals and Fertilizers of the Republic of India and the Chief Minister of Tamil Nadu respectively.

Early life
Before her entry into politics, Kanimozhi was involved in journalism, such as sub editor for The Hindu, editor in charge of Kungumam (a Tamil weekly magazine) and a features editor for a Singapore based Tamil newspaper called Tamil Murasu.

Social Works

Interests
Kanimozhi has been known to support pan-Tamil issues. She takes part in organising women empowerment programs and is interested in the welfare of differently abled people and transgender people. In 2005, with Karthi Chidambaram, she founded a portal supporting free speech.

Chennai Sangamam
In 2007, Kanimozhi conceived the idea of the Chennai Sangamam, an annual open Tamil cultural festival, usually held during the Pongal season.

Job fairs
She plans to conduct similar fairs all over Tamil Nadu.

Literary works
 Sigarangalil Uraikiradhu Kaalam
 Agathinai
 Paarvaigal
 Karukkum Marudhaani
 Karuvarai Vaasanai

Her literary works were translated into English, Malayalam, Telugu and Kannada.

Silappathikaram
Kanimozhi has worked on a production titled Silappadikaram, A woman of Substance based on a Tamil epic of the same name with Bombay Jayashri.

Personal life
Kanimozhi was a student of Presentation Convent, Church Park in Chennai and later did her master's degree in economics in Ethiraj College for Women from the Madras University. She has been married twice; firstly in 1989 to Athiban Bose, a businessman from Sivakasi (since divorced), and then to G. Aravindan, a Singapore-based Tamil writer, in 1997. She has a son named Aditya Aravindan.

Political career

As a Rajya Sabha MP
In May 2007, the DMK nominated Kanimozhi as one of the party's candidates for the Rajya Sabha. She became a Rajya Sabha member for the second time in 2013. Kanimozhi was the leader of the DMK in the house and was the voice of the state of Tamil Nadu in the Upper house.

As a Lok Sabha MP
She was elected from Thoothukkudi as the first female MP of that constituency for the 17th Lok Sabha, which was held in the year 2019, and was elected as the DMK's deputy leader of the Lok Sabha. As of September 2019 and September 2022, Kanimozhi works as the chairperson of the Parliament Standing Committee on Chemicals and Fertilizers and Rural Development and Panchayati Raj, respectively.

As a Trade Union leader
She is the president of The Hindu National Press employees union. She is the first woman to be elected to that post.

Women's Wing Secretary of the DMK
She was the women's wing secretary of the DMK party and encourages women to enter politics. She has organised training camps for the district-level office-bearers of the women's wing. She also organised a rally in Delhi, demanding that the women's reservation bill be passed by the parliament.

Deputy General Secretary of the DMK
On 9 October 2022, the Chief Minister of Tamil Nadu and the DMK President M. K. Stalin, announced and appointed Kanimozhi as the deputy general secretary to the DMK party in the presence of the party's general secretary Durai Murugan at the General Council Meeting held in Chennai.

Elections contested and positions held
Kanimozhi has been elected as M.P. of Lok Sabha from Thoothukkudi constituency. This was her first direct electoral performance. 
She resigned her Rajya Sabha MP post on 29 May 2019 after being elected to 17th Lok Sabha.

Lok Sabha Election

Posts in Parliament of India

2G spectrum case

As per the chargesheet filed by CBI, Kanimozhi has 20% stake in her family owned Kalaignar TV, her step-mother Dayalu Ammal owns 60% stake in the same channel. CBI alleged that Kanimozhi was an "active brain" behind the channel's operations and she worked along with former telecom minister A. Raja to get DB Realty promoter Shahid Balwa to circuitously route 2 billion (US$36.2 million) to Kalaignar TV. According to CBI, Kanimozhi was in regular touch with A. Raja regarding launching of Kalaignar TV channel and its other pending works. A. Kanimozhi had spent 190 days in Tihar Jail in 2011 after the CBI named her an "active brain" behind the functioning and setting up of Kalaignar TV.
Raja was further pursuing the cause of Kalaignar TV not only for getting registration of the company from Ministry of Information and Broadcasting but also for getting it in the DTH operator TATA Sky's bouquet. She was also summoned by the Income Tax Department, Chennai for alleged tax evasion charges.

On 3 July 2012, briefing the joint parliamentary committee probing the scam, ED claimed that it has enough evidence to convict DMK chief Karunanidhi's wife and daughter Kanimozhi.

Kanimozhi has defended herself by arguing that she is only a 20% shareholder in the company, who has no involvement in the financial aspects or the liability of a director.

During the course of the trial, Kanimozhi's name was cleared by at least one witness who deposed that she had no involvement in the day-to-day affairs of Kalaignar TV and that she was initially reluctant to join the management of the channel. It was also admitted in court that Kanimozhi resigned from Kalaignar board after only two weeks to become a Member of Parliament. In an extraordinary twist, on 21 December 2017 a special CBI court acquitted her along with 19 others accused including A. Raja in 2G spectrum allocation cases. The Court said that the prosecution had failed to prove any of its charge. Thus all accused were acquitted.

References

External links 
 Profile on Lok Sabha website
 

 

1968 births
Living people
Politicians from Chennai
Tamil Nadu politicians
Women in Tamil Nadu politics
Dravida Munnetra Kazhagam politicians
Rajya Sabha members from Tamil Nadu
Lok Sabha members from Tamil Nadu
Members of Parliament from Tamil Nadu
India MPs 2019–present
Indian Tamil people
Karunanidhi family
Indian atheists
Women members of the Rajya Sabha
Women members of the Lok Sabha
Women writers from Tamil Nadu
Indian women journalists
Indian women editors
Poets from Tamil Nadu
Tamil poets
Tamil journalists
The Hindu Group
2G spectrum case
Indian prisoners and detainees
Inmates of Tihar Jail
Prisoners and detainees of India
Ethiraj College for Women alumni
University of Madras alumni
21st-century Indian politicians
21st-century Indian women politicians
People charged with corruption